Robert-Alain de Beaugrande (1946 – June 2008) was an American text linguist and discourse analyst, one of the leading figures of the Continental tradition in the discipline. He was one of the developers of the Vienna School of Textlinguistik (Department of Linguistics at the University of Vienna), and published the seminal Introduction to Text Linguistics in 1981, with Wolfgang U. Dressler. He was also a major figure in the consolidation of critical discourse analysis.

De Beaugrande had an MA in German and English Language and Literature by the Free University of Berlin, in 1971, and a PhD in Comparative Literature and Linguistics by the University of California, Irvine, in 1976. He served as professor of English in the University of Florida from 1978 to 1991, of English Linguistics at the University of Vienna from 1991 to 1997, Professor of English Language at the University of Botswana in Gaborone, Professor of English and English Linguistics at the University of Florida at Gainesville, and later as visiting professor in several universities in Asia, the Middle East, and Latin America.

Selected works
 Text, Discourse and Process: Toward a Multidisciplinary Science of Texts. Norwood, N.J.: Ablex, 1980
 Introduction to Text Linguistics (with Wolfgang Dressler). London: Longman, 1981.
 Text Production. Norwood, N.J.: Ablex, 1984
 Critical Discourse: A Survey of Contemporary Literary Theorists. Norwood, N.J.: Ablex, 1988
 New Foundations for a Science of Text and Discourse. Greenwich, CT: Ablex, 1997
 A New Introduction to the Study of Text and Discourse. Uploaded to personal website June 2004.

External links
 Home page (archived, containing many of his original works)

20th-century linguists
1946 births
2008 deaths
Academic staff of the University of Botswana
Free University of Berlin alumni
University of California, Irvine alumni
University of Florida faculty
Academic staff of the University of Vienna
Linguists from the United States